The 1999 Direct Line International Championships singles was the singles event of the twenty-fifth edition of the Eastbourne International, a WTA Tier II tournament held in Eastbourne, England, United Kingdom and part of the European grass court season. Jana Novotná was the defending champion but retired earlier in the year.

Natasha Zvereva won in the final 0–6, 7–5, 6–3 against Nathalie Tauziat.

Seeds
The top four seeds received a bye to the second round.

Draw

Finals

Top half

Bottom half

Qualifying

Seeds

Qualifiers

Lucky loser
  Maureen Drake

Qualifying draw

First qualifier

Second qualifier

Third qualifier

Fourth qualifier

External links
 1999 Direct Line International Championships Draw

Direct Line International Championships
Singles